Trey Martinez Fischer (born June 6, 1970), legally Ferdinand Frank Fischer III, is a Democratic member of the Texas House of Representatives who represents the San Antonio-based 116th District, serving since 2019. He previously held this seat from 2000 through 2017. In January 2017, he was succeeded in the position by Diana Arevalo, the secretary for the Bexar County Democratic Party. In 2018, he unseated Arevalo in the Democratic primary for his former state House seat. He won the subsequent general election on November 6 over the Republican nominee Fernando Padron, 32,375 votes (70.4 percent) to 13,612 (29.6 percent). Martinez Fischer returned to the House in January 2019.

Martinez Fischer was born and raised in San Antonio. He graduated from Oliver Wendell Holmes High School. He received his Bachelor of Arts from the University of Texas at San Antonio, and in 1994 was selected to study as a National Urban Fellow. He is a graduate of Baruch College of Public Affairs in New York City, and the University of Texas School of Law.

He was named one of the "10 Best Legislators" by Texas Monthly magazine in both 2013 and 2015, who described him as a "soldier prepared to do battle but ready to make peace". The Houston Chronicle and the San Francisco Chronicle named him one of the "20 Latino political rising stars of 2012", placing him among those under 55, "who just might change the face of American politics over the next two decades".

Martinez Fischer is the chairman of the Mexican American Legislative Caucus.

Legislative career

Martinez Fischer was first elected to District 118 seat in the Texas House of Representatives in 2000. In 2011, he was the lead Democratic author on HB 3727, the Boeing Bill. As a result of this bill, Air Force One will be refitted and repaired in San Antonio.

He was selected by then House Speaker Joe Straus to sit on the Select Committee on Transparency in State Agency Operations, and the Select Committee on Redistricting during the first called special session of the 83rd Legislature.

On February 17, 2015, Martinez Fischer was defeated in a special election by fellow Democratic House colleague Jose Menendez for the District 26 seat in the Texas Senate. The regular election was hotly contested, with Martinez Fischer earning a double-digit lead over his opponent. In a special runoff election marked by low turnout among Democratic voters and unprecedented participation by San Antonio Republicans, Menendez edged out Martinez Fischer.

Martinez Fischer challenged and lost again to Menendez for a full Senate term in the Democratic primary on March 1, 2016. Diana Arevalo won the Democratic primary for the seat Martinez Fischer held through 2017, and as she was unopposed in the general election, succeeded Martinez Fischer in January 2017.

Martinez Fischer returned to the Texas House of Representatives in 2019, having won both the primary and general elections in 2018.

Disparaging remarks

On June 27, 2014, while speaking at the Texas Democratic Convention, Martinez Fischer used an ethnic slur in Spanish to describe the Republican Party, saying "GOP" should stand for "gringos y otros pendejos." His office had also been handing out six Lotería cards to delegates, one depicting Republican gubernatorial candidate Greg Abbott as "El Diablito." Martinez Fischer responded by saying that if he had known Abbott was in attendance, he would have "told him directly to his face."

Personal life
He and his wife, the former Elizabeth Provencio, an attorney and trustee of the San Antonio Water System, are the parents of two daughters.

References

External links
Texas House of Representatives - Trey Martinez Fischer
Texas Tribune profile
Campaign website

1970 births
21st-century American politicians
American politicians of Mexican descent
Baruch College alumni
Democratic Party members of the Texas House of Representatives
Hispanic and Latino American state legislators in Texas
Living people
Texas Democrats
Texas lawyers
University of Texas at San Antonio alumni
University of Texas School of Law alumni